The Ohio Republican Party is the Ohio affiliate of the Republican Party. It was founded in Columbus, Ohio, in 1854.

History

After the Civil War, Ohio politics was dominated by the Republican Party, and Ohio Republicans also played key roles in the national party. As the national Republican Party changed from a party affiliated with Northern states into a staunchly conservative party, so did the Ohio Republican Party.

Early years

Early Ohio Republicans such as Salmon P. Chase staffed many important national offices. Chase coined the phrase "Free Soil, Free Labor, Free Men". Starting in the 1880s, Ohio's Mark Hanna was a significant power in the back rooms of the national Republican party. In the 1890s, Hanna led the conservative wing of the party against Theodore Roosevelt's progressive movement.

In the 60 years from 1860 to 1920, Ohioans headed the Republican presidential ticket nine times, losing only twice. In 1912, Democrat Woodrow Wilson won with 40.96 percent of the vote, the Republican ticket was split, with Theodore Roosevelt leaving to start the Bull-Moose Party. In the 1916 election, Wilson won again with 49.24 percent of the vote.

During the next three presidential elections, the Republican candidate won Ohio, until 1932 when Franklin D. Roosevelt won the state. FDR would win Ohio in 1932, 1936, and 1940.

Post New Deal
The national political upheaval that ushered in the New Deal era in the 1930s benefited the Ohio Democratic Party. Party politics in Ohio became very competitive, with Republicans and Democrats trading victories at all levels.

During this time Robert A. Taft, known as "Mr. Republican," became the leader of the conservative wing of the Republican party during a time when progressives controlled both major parties, and one of the most popular Senators in Ohio history.

From the 1930s to the 1970s, Republicans still won the majority of elective offices in Ohio. Starting in the 1960s Ohio Democrats began to win more elections with rulings from the United States Supreme Court that required district representation be based on population and not land sized. The equalization of legislative districts shifted power to Ohio's cities and away from rural farmers. By the mid-1980s, Ohio government at all levels was dominated by Democrats.

By 1990, the Republicans had won a majority on the Ohio Apportionment Board, which draws district lines for federal and state legislative seats. The 1992 adoption of term limits by referendum further strengthened the party's hand and 1992 marked the last victory by a Democrat (John Glenn) in a statewide race until 2006.

State of the party
Redistricting after the 2000 census combined with Ohio's term limits laws had Republican officeholders at the federal and state levels struggling with each other to draw federal congressional districts to create safe seats, with the interests of incumbent US representatives clashing with the interests of state legislators facing term limits looking to Congress for their next jobs. About 43 percent of the voters voted for Democrats in 2000.

Joe Hallett wrote in the Columbus Dispatch (January 13, 2002):
Redistricting should be a happy process for Republicans.... But the task has hardly been gleeful. Contrarily, it has turned into an embarrassment for Republicans.... Eight-year term limits, more than the state budget, are to blame. These days, state lawmakers constantly are scouting their next jobs.... [V]isions of Congress dance in their heads. They want districts ready-made for their ascensions. Meanwhile, congressional incumbents constantly angle for districts they can't possibly lose.

Although term limits were pushed by conservative Republican activists in the 1980s, they forced the retirement of Republican Speaker Jo Ann Davidson (R-Columbus) from the House of Representatives in 2001 as well as the leader of the conservative wing of the party, Deputy Speaker William G. Batchelder (R-Medina).

In 2001, Republicans sought United States House of Representatives seats held by Democrats Sherrod Brown and Ted Strickland. The state legislature considered redrawing their districts. Critics allege the motivation was to aid in Republican victories. When Democrat Brown threatened to run for governor in 2002, if he lost his seat through redistricting, the legislature scrapped redistricting plans. Republican Governor Taft won re-election. Taft was challenged by Cuyahoga County commissioner Tim Hagan. Both Brown and Strickland held onto their congressional seats.

By 2004, Republicans held all six statewide executive offices (governor/lieutenant governor, attorney general, secretary of state, auditor, and treasurer), a two-thirds majority in the state senate and house, a 5-2 majority on the Supreme Court, both seats in the US Senate, and 12 of Ohio's 18 seats in the US House of Representatives. In 2006, Democrats began to retake some statewide offices. These include all of the executive offices except State Auditor (including the governorship going to Ted Strickland over Republican challenger J. Kenneth Blackwell) and one of the seats in the US Senate (Sherrod Brown defeating incumbent Mike DeWine).

Ohio Republicans still held ten seats in the US House of Representatives, one seat in the U.S. Senate, and a majority in both houses of the Ohio General Assembly. Between the election of Robert Cupp in 2007, the death of Chief Justice Thomas Moyer, and the appointment of Democrat Eric Brown in 2010, Republicans had controlled all seven seats on the Ohio Supreme Court previously.

In 2008, Democratic presidential candidate Barack Obama defeated Republican John McCain in Ohio.

In 2010, Republicans regained all of the statewide elected executive offices, including the governorship with the election of John Kasich, and regained the majority in the state House of Representatives and retaining the state Senate. Republicans also retained their seat in the U.S. Senate with the election of Rob Portman and retained a majority of the seats in the U.S. House of Representatives. In addition, 8th District Representative John Boehner was elected Speaker of the United States House of Representatives, making him third in line of succession (and the highest ranking Republican) to the Presidency of the United States.

In November 2011, Gov. John Kasich's law that limits public worker's union bargain abilities was voted down by the people of Ohio. This was a major blow to the platform that Gov. Kasich ran on in 2010.

Pro-Donald Trump turn 
In 2017, Donald Trump helped to install Jane Timken as head of the Ohio Republican Party. When she left to run for the Senate, the Ohio Republican Party replaced her with former Trump Ohio campaign manager Bob Paduchik.

In 2021, the Ohio Republican Party called on Republican House Representative Anthony Gonzalez to resign after he voted to impeach former President Donald Trump for his role in inciting a pro-Trump mob to storm the U.S. Capitol. The party also voted to censure Gonzalez. The Cincinnati Enquirer wrote that the Ohio Republican Party "has increasingly become the party of Trump."

Taft family political power
The Taft family has been one of the most powerful political families in American history. Robert Taft, Sr. was the first Taft to come to America, around the 1670s. The Ohio section of Taft's are descendants of Robert, Sr.

The start of the five generations of Taft's in politics was with Alphonso Taft. He was the founder of the Ohio political dynasty that is associated with the Republican Party.  Alphonso was in President Ulysses S. Grant's Cabinet, first as Attorney General then as Secretary of War. He was later appointed US Ambassador to the Austria-Hungary Empire.

Three of Alphonso's sons entered into politics also, former US Representative of Ohio's 1st District Charles Phelps Taft, former US president and Chief Justice of the United States William Howard Taft, and former Republican Party Delegate Henry Waters Taft.

Both of William H. Taft's sons entered into politics. Robert A. Taft was a former US Senator and his other son Charles Phelps Taft II was former Mayor of Cincinnati. Both men were seen as great politicians.

The next generation of Taft politicians came from two of Robert's children. Robert Taft, Jr. served in both houses of the US Congress. His brother William Howard Taft III was Ambassador to Ireland.

The current generation of Tafts in politics are former Ohio Governor Bob Taft, son of Robert Taft Jr. William Howard Taft IV, son of William H. Taft III, has been an Ambassador to NATO and United States Deputy Secretary of Defense.

Controversies

In 2005, the Republican fundraiser and coin dealer Thomas Noe ran a rare coin fund that the State of Ohio had invested $50 million in. Soon valuable coins came up missing and an investigation discovered Noe had taken around $13 million from the fund. He was convicted in 2006 and was sentenced to 18 years in state prison.

Noe was a top fundraiser for the George W. Bush campaign in Ohio in 2004, and the chairman for his campaign in Northwest Ohio. He was later convicted of making illegal contributions to the Bush campaign.

Noe had ties to then Governor Bob Taft. It was discovered through this scandal that the Governor and some of his top aides took improper gifts from Noe and other lobbyist. In 2005, Gov. Taft was charged with four misdemeanors related to these gifts.

This scandal had a negative effect on the Ohio Republican Party, who lost many seats in Congress after 2006 and the Governorship went to Ted Strickland. In 2008, Barack Obama won Ohio's 20 electoral college votes on his way to the presidency.

Elected officials

Members of Congress

U.S. Senate
J. D. Vance

U.S. House of Representatives
Brad Wenstrup, 2nd district
Jim Jordan, 4th district
Bob Latta, 5th district
Bill Johnson, 6th district
Max Miller, 7th district
Warren Davidson, 8th district
Mike Turner, 10th district
Troy Balderson, 12th district
David Joyce, 14th district
Mike Carey, 15th district

Statewide offices
Governor: Mike DeWine
Lieutenant Governor: Jon Husted
Attorney General: Dave Yost
Secretary of State: Frank LaRose
State Treasurer: Robert Sprague
State Auditor: Keith Faber

State legislative leaders

Ohio Senate
President of the Senate: Matt Huffman
President pro tempore of the Senate:
Majority Floor Leader:
Whip:

Ohio House of Representatives
Speaker of the House: Jason Stephens
Speaker pro tempore:
Majority Floor Leader: Bill Seitz
Assistant Majority Floor Leader:
Majority Whip:
Assistant Majority Whip:

State Supreme Court
 Chief Justice: Sharon L. Kennedy
 Associate Justices:
Patrick F. Fischer
Pat DeWine
Joe Deters

Party leadership

Chairman - Alex Triantafilou

Notable Ohio Republicans

Salmon P. Chase: US Senator, Governor of Ohio, United States Secretary of the Treasury, Chief Justice of the United States
Charles William Foster, Jr.: US representative, Governor of Ohio, United States Secretary of the Treasury
Rutherford B. Hayes: US representative, Governor of Ohio, President of the United States
William McKinley: US Representative, Governor of Ohio, President of the United States
William Dennison: Governor of Ohio, United States Postmaster General
David Tod: Governor of Ohio, Ambassador to Brazil
Jacob Dolson Cox: Governor of Ohio, United States Secretary of the Interior
John W. Bricker: Ohio Attorney General, Governor of Ohio, US Senator, Republican nominee for Vice President of the United States
Edward F. Noyes: Governor of Ohio, Ambassador to France
Thomas L. Young: Governor of Ohio, US Representative
Joseph B. Foraker: Governor of Ohio, US Senator
George K. Nash: Ohio Attorney General, Governor of Ohio
Frank B. Willis: Governor of Ohio, US Representative, US Senator
C. William O'Neill: Ohio Attorney General, Governor of Ohio, Justice of the Ohio Supreme Court
James A. Rhodes: mayor of Columbus, Ohio, Ohio State Auditor, Governor of Ohio, candidate for Republican nomination for President of the United States (1964, 1968), candidate for Republican nomination to the US Senate
Warren G. Harding: US senator, Lieutenant Governor of Ohio, President of the United States
Benjamin F. Wade: US Senator, a Radical Republican, President Pro Tempore of the United States Senate
James A. Garfield: US Representative, President of the United States
James Rudolph Garfield: United States Secretary of the Interior
Ulysses S. Grant: commander of Union forces in the Civil War; President of the United States
Benjamin Harrison: US Senator, President of the United States
William H. Taft I: United States Secretary of War, President of the United States, Chief Justice of the United States
William B. Saxbe: US Senator, US attorney general, ambassador to India
John Sherman: US representative, United States Secretary of the Treasury, US Senator, chairman of the Senate Republican Conference, United States Secretary of State, author of the Sherman Antitrust Act
Robert A. Taft I: Speaker of the Ohio House of Representatives, US Senator, chairman of the Senate Republican Conference, candidate for Republican nomination for President of the United States (1940, 1948, 1952)
Harold H. Burton: Ohio State Representative, mayor of Cleveland, US Senator, Associate Justice of the Supreme Court of the United States
Simeon D. Fess: US Representative, US Senator
Nicholas Longworth: Speaker of the US House of Representatives
Potter Stewart: Associate Justice of the United States Supreme Court
Kingsley A. Taft: US Senator, Chief Justice of the Ohio Supreme Court
Bob Taft: Governor of Ohio
George Voinovich: US Senator, Governor of Ohio, Lieutenant Governor of Ohio, Mayor of Cleveland

Party symbols
Ohio Republicans use the same symbols used by the national Republican Party, such as the elephant. The Ohio Republican Party logo features a white elephant silhouette over the shape of Ohio in red, with blue outlining its northern border.

See also
Political party strength in Ohio
Politics of Ohio
List of United States representatives from Ohio

Footnotes

Further reading

 Joseph P. Smith, History Of The Republican Party In Ohio: And Memoirs of Its Representative Supporters, In Two Imperial Quarto Volumes. Chicago: Lewis Publishing Co., 1898. Vol. I | Vol. II

External links
Ohio Republican Party
Ohio College Republican Federation
Butler County Republican Party in Butler County, Ohio
Ohio Federation of Republican Women
Jo Ann Davidson Leadership Institute

1854 establishments in Ohio
Political parties established in 1854
Republican Party (United States) by state
Republican Party